Yyrkoon  is a French death metal band. The main lyrical themes revolve around occultism, horror/fantasy, and members' personal philosophies. The name Yyrkoon is derived from the name of Elric of Melniboné's cousin in Michael Moorcock's fantasy series.

Biography

Demos, Oniric Transition 
The band was formed in 1995 by Stéphane Souteyrand (guitar & keyboards), Laurent Harrouart (drums), Paul Banas (vocals & guitar), and Sébastien Caron (bass guitar). One year later, Yyrkoon decided to self-record the first 5-song demo tape, Oath, Obscure, Occult…, which included unique sounds to typical death metal like female vocals, violin, and flute. This tape was well received in the underground.

The demo was sent to different French labels and Velvet Music International signed the band. Personal conflicts during the recording of the band's debut album led to a few lineup changes. Banas and Caron left the band, resulting in the recruitment of Jérôme Barouin on guitar and Kristofer Laurent on bass guitar. Stéphane Souteyrand switched to vocals and asked friend Jeff Gautier to perform keyboard parts. The band recorded its first album, Oniric Transition, in 1998 at the Walnut Grove Studio in Amiens, France.

After not being contacted with another deal from Velvet Music International, Yyrkoon was forced to find a new label. Another demo, entitled Forgotten Past, was recorded and distributed. During this time, Barouin left the band, which went for 7–8 months without a second guitarist. After a difficult search, François Falempin joined on guitar while Kristofer Laurent was fired and replaced by Victorien Villchez. Yyrkoon began touring with other well-known European bands such as Septic Flesh, Misanthrope, Aborted, Gojira, Scarve, and Mercyless.

Dying Sun 
Following a show in Paris in 2001, Yyrkoon met Stéphane Brulez, manager for the label Anvil Prod, who gave the band a two-album deal. Yyrkoon was the first band signed to Anvil Prod. The band's second album, Dying Sun, was released in 2002 to positive reviews albeit a different, more thrash metal-influenced sound.

Occult Medicine 
In 2003, the band begun composing its third album, during which time Falempin left the band and Gautier took over the guitar position from keyboards. Occult Medicine was recorded in Denmark at Jacob Hansen studios. Before recording, Harrouart lost motivation to continue with the band because of personal problems. Yyrkoon hired Dirk Verbeuren (of Soilwork and Scarve fame) to record the drum tracks.

Occult Medicine was sent to many different labels before its release since Yyrkoon was displeased with Anvil Prod's management job. After a few weeks, Osmose Productions signed the band with a two-record deal that included Occult Medicine, with which the band has been quite pleased.

Unhealthy Opera and disbanding 
The band's fourth album, Unhealthy Opera, was released in 2006 on Osmose. After a year of touring, the band was placed on hiatus in late February 2007 due to Souteryand's lack of motivation and enthusiasm.

Discography 
Oath, Obscure, Occult… (demo, 1996)
Oniric Transition (1998)
Forgotten Past (mini CD, 2000)
Dying Sun (2002)
Occult Medicine (2004)
Unhealthy Opera (2006)

Members

Current members 
Stéphane Souteyrand – guitar, vocals
Laurent Harrouart – drums

Former members 
Victorién Vilchez – bass guitar, classical guitar
Paul Banas – guitar, vocals
Sébastien Caron – bass guitar
Jérôme Barouin – guitar (session)
Kristofer Laurent – bass guitar
François Falempin – guitar
Dirk Verbeuren – drums (session)

References

External links 
Official page (archived)
Profile at brnmetal.com
Osmose Productions
Official Band MySpace

French death metal musical groups
Musical groups established in 1995
Musical groups disestablished in 2007
French musical duos
Musical groups from Amiens